Liu Sheng (born 8 September 1989 in Xingning) is a Chinese footballer who currently plays as a defender for Meizhou Hakka.

Club career
Liu Sheng started his professional career with China League Two side Guangdong Sunray Cave in 2007. He would often been used as a substitute early in career, however he was part of the Guangdong Sunray Cave squad that won promotion to the second tier in 2008. Going on to establish himself as a regular within the team on 1 September 2012, he scored his first senior goal in a 2–2 away draw against Chongqing Lifan.

In February 2015, Liu transferred to China League One side Tianjin Songjiang. He kept his starting position in the team throughout the 2016 season when Quanjian Nature Medicine took over the club. He made 23 league appearances and scored one goal as Tianjin Quanjian won the title and promoted to the Chinese Super League. He made his Super League debut on 4 November 2017 in a 2–1 away win against Guangzhou Evergrande.

On 28 February 2018, Liu transferred to newly promoted China League One side Meixian Techand. In his first season with the club he would aid them in remaining within the league by helping them avoid relegation. At the end of the following campaign the club dissolved after failing to submit a salary and bonus confirmation form.

On 8 August 2020, he signed with Wuhan Three Towns. In his first season with the club he would go on to aid them in winning the division title and promotion into the second tier. Despite gaining promotion with Wuhan Three Towns, Liu was allowed to return to his hometown and join another second tier club in Meizhou Hakka on loan on 13 April 2021. He would then go on to be a vital member of the team that gained promotion to the top tier after coming second within the division at the end of the 2021 China League One campaign. On 19 March 2022 his loan move to Meizhou would become permanent.

Career statistics
Statistics accurate as of match played 31 December 2022.

Honours

Club
Tianjin Quanjian F.C.
China League One: 2016 
Wuhan Three Towns
China League Two: 2020

References

External links
 

1989 births
Living people
Chinese footballers
Footballers from Meizhou
People from Xingning
Hakka sportspeople
Guangdong Sunray Cave players
Tianjin Tianhai F.C. players
Guangdong South China Tiger F.C. players
China League One players
Chinese Super League players
Association football defenders